Pyrgocythara albovittata is a species of sea snail, a marine gastropod mollusk in the family Mangeliidae.

Description
The length of the shell varies between 4 mm and 6.4 mm.

The orange-banded shell is ovately oblong. The whorls have a narrow shoulder. They are longitudinally strongly ribbed with white, obtuse ribs close-set.

This species was described and figured by Reeve a few months later, under the name of Mangilia luteofasciata, and without locality.

Distribution
This species occurs in the Caribbean Sea and the Lesser Antilles.

References

 Adams, Charles Baker. "Specierum novarum conchyliorum." Jamaica repertorum, synopsis. Proceedings of the Boston Society of Natural History 2.1 (1845): 17.

External links
  
 

albovittata
Gastropods described in 1845